The 52nd Cannes Film Festival was held from 12 to 23 May 1999. Canadian filmmaker, actor and author David Cronenberg was the Jury President. The Palme d'Or went to the French–Belgian film Rosetta by Jean-Pierre and Luc Dardenne.

The festival opened with The Barber of Siberia, directed by Nikita Mikhalkov and closed with An Ideal Husband, directed by Oliver Parker. Kristin Scott Thomas was the mistress of ceremonies.

Juries

Main competition
The following people were appointed as the Jury for the feature films of the 1999 Official Selection:
 David Cronenberg (Canada) Jury President
 André Téchiné (France)
 Barbara Hendricks (Sweden)
 Dominique Blanc (France)
 Doris Dörrie (Germany)
 George Miller (Australia)
 Holly Hunter (United States)
 Jeff Goldblum (United States)
 Maurizio Nichetti (Italy)
 Yasmina Reza (France)

Un Certain Regard
The following people were appointed as the Jury of the 1999 Un Certain Regard:
Lambert Wilson (actor) President
 Irène Bignardi (critic)
 Annie Coppermann (critic)
 Thierry Gandillot (critic)
 Jonathan Romney (critic)
Laurent Tirard (director)

Cinéfondation and short films
The following people were appointed as the Jury of the Cinéfondation and short films competition:
Thomas Vinterberg (director) President
Cédric Klapisch (director)
Virginie Ledoyen (actress)
Walter Salles (director)
Greta Scacchi (actress)

Camera d'Or
The following people were appointed as the Jury of the 1999 Camera d'Or:
Michel Piccoli (actor) President
Peter Von Bagh (film historian, director)
 Jean-Pierre Beauviala
 Cherifa Chabane (critic)
Caroline Champetier (cinematographer)
 Paola Malanga (critic)
 José Maria Riba (critic)
Marie Vermillard (director)

Official selection

In competition – Feature film
The following feature films competed for the Palme d'Or:

 8½ Women by Peter Greenaway
 All About My Mother (Todo sobre mi madre) by Pedro Almodóvar
 Cradle Will Rock by Tim Robbins
 The Emperor and the Assassin (Jing Ke ci Qin Wang) by Chen Kaige
 Felicia's Journey by Atom Egoyan
 Ghost Dog: The Way of the Samurai by Jim Jarmusch
 Humanité (L'humanité) by Bruno Dumont
 Kadosh by Amos Gitai
 Kikujiro (Kikujirô no natsu) by Takeshi Kitano
 The Letter (La lettre) by Manoel de Oliveira
 Limbo by John Sayles
 Love Will Tear Us Apart (Tin seung yan gaan) by Nelson Yu Lik-wai
 Moloch (Molokh) by Alexander Sokurov
 The Nanny (La balia) by Marco Bellocchio
 No One Writes to the Colonel (El coronel no tiene quien le escriba) by Arturo Ripstein
 Our Happy Lives (Nos vies heureuses) by Jacques Maillot
 Pola X by Leos Carax
 Rosetta by Jean-Pierre Dardenne, Luc Dardenne
 The Straight Story by David Lynch
 Tales of Kish (Ghessé hayé kish) by Abolfazl Jalili, Mohsen Makhmalbaf, Nasser Taghvai
 Time Regained (Le temps retrouvé, d'après l'oeuvre de Marcel Proust) by Raúl Ruiz
 Wonderland by Michael Winterbottom

Un Certain Regard
The following films were selected for the competition of Un Certain Regard:

 As Bodas de Deus by João César Monteiro
 Away with Words by Christopher Doyle
 Beautiful People by Jasmin Dizdar
 Beresina, or the Last Days of Switzerland (Beresina oder Die letzten Tage der Schweiz) by Daniel Schmid
 Genesis (La genèse) by Cheick Oumar Sissoko
 Harem Suare by Ferzan Özpetek
 If I Give You my Humbleness, Don't Take Away my Pride by Karin Westerlund
 Judy Berlin by Eric Mendelsohn
 Kaizokuban Bootleg Film by Masahiro Kobayashi
 March of Happiness (Tian ma cha fang) by Lin Cheng-sheng
 Nadia and the Hippos (Nadia et les hippopotames) by Dominique Cabrera
 New Dawn (Peau neuve) by Émilie Deleuze
 Olympic Garage (Garage Olimpo) by Marco Bechis
 The Other (L'autre) by Youssef Chahine
 The Passengers (Les passagers) by Jean-Claude Guiguet
 The Personals (Zheng hun qi shi) by Chen Kuo-fu
 Ratcatcher by Lynne Ramsay
 The Shade by Raphael Nadjari
 Sicilia! by Jean-Marie Straub, Danièle Huillet
 So Close to Paradise by Wang Xiaoshuai
 Throne of Death (Marana Simhasanam) by Murali Nair
 Vanaprastham by Shaji N. Karun
 The Winslow Boy by David Mamet

Films out of competition
The following films were selected to be screened out of competition:

 The Barber of Siberia by Nikita Mikhalkov
 Dogma by Kevin Smith
 EDtv by Ron Howard
 Entrapment by Jon Amiel (Special screening)
 Farewell, Home Sweet Home (Adieu, plancher des vaches!) by Otar Iosseliani
 An Ideal Husband by Oliver Parker
 The Limey by Steven Soderbergh
 My Best Fiend (Mein liebster Feind) by Werner Herzog

Cinéfondation
The following films were selected for the competition of Cinéfondation:

 Baballoon (Babalon) by Michal Zabka
 Cambi e Scambi by Donata Pizzato
 The Clock by Noah Laracy
 Dimanche by Fabrice Aragno
 The Execution by Lee In-Kyun
 Fish 073 (Ryba 073) by Vaclav Svankmajer
 Germania by Kris Krikellis
 Im Hukim (With Rules) by Dover Kosashvili
 Inter-View by Jessica Hausner
 Ked Nie, Tak Nie by Vladimir Kral
 Layover by Shen Ko-Shang
 Der Linkshander by Iouri Kouzine
 Little Big Dog (En God Dag At Go) by Bo Hagen Clausen
 Milk by Mairi Cameron
 La Puce by Emmanuelle Bercot
 Runt by Jesse Lawrence
 Second Hand by Emily Young
 Waxandwane by Axel Koenzen
 Wojtek by David Turner
 Yumeji Ningyo (Doll of Dreams) by Yamazaki Tatsuji

Short film competition
The following short films competed for the Short Film Palme d'Or:

 Billy's Balloon by Don Hertzfeldt
 The Cookie Thief by Hugo Currie, Toby Leslie
 Devil Doll by Jarl Olsen
 An Eternity by Daehyun Kim
 Food for Thought by John Paton, Matthew Ross
 Husk by Jerry Handler
 Le Pique-Nique by Il-Gon Song
 Rien Dire by Vincent Pérez (France)
 Roulette by Roberto Santiago
 Simultaneity by Seong Sook Kim
 Stop by Rodolphe Marconi
 When the Day Breaks by Amanda Forbis, Wendy Tilby

Parallel sections

International Critics' Week
The following films were screened for the 38th International Critics' Week (38e Semaine de la Critique):

Feature film competition

 7/25 Nana-ni-go by Wataru Hayakawa (Japan)
 Flores de otro mundo by Icíar Bollaín (Spain)
 Hold Back the Night by Phil Davis (United Kingdom)
 On Board (Gemide) by Serdar Akar (Turkey)
 Siam Sunset by John Polson (Australia)
 Strange Fits of Passion by Elise McCredie (Australia)
 The White Suit (Belo odelo) by Lazar Ristovski (FR Yugoslavia)

Short film competition

 The Circle (Dayereh) by Mohammad Shirvani (Iran)
 Dérapages by Pascal Adant (Belgium) 
 Fuzzy Logic by Tom Krueger (United States)
 The Good Son by Sean McGuire (United Kingdom)
 La Leçon du jour by Irène Sohm (France)
 More by Mark Osborne (United States)
 Shoes Off! by Mark Sawers (Canada)

Directors' Fortnight
The following films were screened for the 1999 Directors' Fortnight (Quinzaine des Réalizateurs):

 A mort la mort ! by Romain Goupil
 Agnes Browne by Anjelica Huston
 The Blair Witch Project by Daniel Myrick, Eduardo Sánchez
 Le Bleu des villes by Stéphane Brizé
 Charisma by Kiyoshi Kurosawa
 Un château en Espagne by Delphine Gleize
 Les Convoyeurs attendent by Benoît Mariage
 The Cup (Phörpa) by Khyentse Norbu
 Darkness and Light (Hei An Zhi Guang) by Chang Tso-Chi
 East Is East by Damien O'Donnell
 El entusiasmo by Ricardo Larraín
 Fever by Alex Winter
 The Five Senses by Jeremy Podeswa
 Haut les cœurs! by Sólveig Anspach
 Kiemas by Valdas Navasaitis
 The Last September by Deborah Warner
 M/Other by Nobuhiro Suwa
 Qui plume la lune ? by Christine Carrière
 Scenery by Zhao Jisong
 Sud by Chantal Akerman
 Summer of Sam by Spike Lee
 The Virgin Suicides by Sofia Coppola
 The War Zone by Tim Roth
 Voyages by Emmanuel Finkiel
 Paths in the Night by Andreas Kleinert

Short films

 Le Franc by Djibril Diop Mambety (45 min.)
 Marée haute by Caroline Champetier (17 min.)
 Un petit air de fête by Eric Guirado (35 min.)
 La Petite Vendeuse de Soleil (or The Little Girl Who Sold the Sun) by Djibril Diop Mambety (45 min.)
 Le Premier pas by Florence Vignon (23 min.)
 La Tentation de l'innocence by Fabienne Godet (43 min.)
 O Trouble by Sylvia Calle (10 min.)

Awards

Official awards
The following films and people received the 1999 Official selection awards:

In Competition
Palme d'Or: Rosetta by Jean-Pierre Dardenne and Luc Dardenne
Grand Prize of the Jury: L'humanité by Bruno Dumont
Best Director: Pedro Almodóvar for Todo sobre mi madre
Best Screenplay: Molokh by Yuri Arabov
Best Actress: 
Séverine Caneele for L'humanité
Émilie Dequenne for Rosetta
Best Actor: Emmanuel Schotté for L'humanité
Jury Prize: La lettre by Manoel de Oliveira
Un Certain Regard
Un Certain Regard Award: Beautiful People by Jasmin Dizdar
Cinéfondation
 First Prize: Second Hand by Emily Young
 Second Prize: Im Hukim by Dover Koshashvili & La puce by Emmanuelle Bercot
 Third Prize: Little Big Dog (En God Dag At Go) by Bo Hagen Clausen
 Special Mention: Inter-View by Jessica Hausner
Golden Camera
Caméra d'Or: Marana Simhasanam by Murali Nair
Short Films
Short Film Palme d'Or: When the Day Breaks by Wendy Tilby and Amanda Forbis
 Jury Prize: Stop by Rodolphe Marconi & Le Pique-Nique by Il-Gon Song

Independent awards
FIPRESCI Prizes
 Peau neuve by Émilie Deleuze (In competition)
 M/Other by Nobuhiro Suwa (Directors' Fortnight)
Commission Supérieure Technique
 Technical Grand Prize: Juhua Tu (production design) in The Emperor and the Assassin (Jing Ke ci Qin Wang)
Ecumenical Jury
 Prize of the Ecumenical Jury: Todo sobre mi madre by Pedro Almodóvar
 Ecumenical Jury – Special Mention: Rosetta by Jean-Pierre Dardenne, Luc Dardenne
Award of the Youth
Foreign Film: The Blair Witch Project by Daniel Myrick, Eduardo Sánchez
French Film: Voyages by Emmanuel Finkiel
Awards in the frame of International Critics' Week
Mercedes-Benz Award: Flores de otro mundo (Flowers from Another World) by Icíar Bollaín
Canal+ Award: Shoes Off! by Mark Sawers
Grand Golden Rail: Siam Sunset by John Polson
Little Golden Rail: Derapages by Pascal Adant
Awards in the frame of Directors' Fortnight
Kodak Short Film Award: Un petit air de fête by Eric Guirado
Kodak Short Film Award – Special Mention Ô trouble by Sylvia Calle
C.I.C.A.E. Award: Qui plume la lune? (Who Plucked the Feathers Off the Moon?) by Christine Carrière
Gras Savoye Award: Un château en Espagne (A Castle in Spain) by Delphine Gleize
Association Prix François Chalais
François Chalais Award: The Other (L'autre) by Youssef Chahine

References

Media
INA: Opening of the 1999 Festival (commentary in French)
INA: List of winners of the 1999 festival (commentary in French)

External links

1999 Cannes Film Festival (web.archive)
Official website Retrospective 1999 
Cannes Film Festival Awards 1999 at Internet Movie Database

Cannes Film Festival, 1999
Cannes Film Festival, 1999
Cannes Film Festival, 1999
Cannes Film Festival
Cannes